Following are lists of members of the Tasmanian House of Assembly:

 1856–1861
 1861–1862
 1862–1866
 1866–1871
 1871–1872
 1872–1877
 1877–1882
 1882–1886
 1886–1891
 1891–1893
 1893–1897
 1897–1900
 1900–1903
 1903–1906
 1906–1909
 1909–1912
 1912–1913

 1913–1916
 1916–1919
 1919–1922
 1922–1925
 1925–1928
 1928–1931
 1931–1934
 1934–1937
 1937–1941
 1941–1946
 1946–1948
 1948–1950
 1950–1955
 1955–1956
 1956–1959
 1959–1964
 1964–1969

 1969–1972
 1972–1976
 1976–1979
 1979–1982
 1982–1986
 1986–1989
 1989–1992
 1992–1996
 1996–1998
 1998–2002
 2002–2006
 2006–2010
 2010–2014
 2014–2018
 2018–2021
 2021–2025